This is a list of regencies and cities in Riau province. As of October 2019, there were 10 regencies and 2 cities.

External links 

 
 
Regencies, Indonesia
Regencies and cities